The following television stations broadcast on digital channel 27 in the United States:

 K27AE-D in Victorville, etc., California, on virtual channel 27
 K27AI-D in Ninilchik, etc., Alaska
 K27CD-D in Boulder, Montana
 K27CL-D in Coos Bay/North Bend, Oregon
 K27CS-D in Montpelier, Idaho
 K27DA-D in Big Sandy Valley, Arizona
 K27DO-D in Bend, etc., Oregon
 K27DX-D in McCall, Idaho
 K27EJ-D in Colorado City, Arizona
 K27FI-D in Frost, Minnesota
 K27GB-D in Beryl/Modena/New Castle, Utah
 K27GC-D in Heber/Midway, Utah, on virtual channel 5, which rebroadcasts KSL-TV
 K27GD-D in Park City, Utah, on virtual channel 5, which rebroadcasts KSL-TV
 K27GL-D in Hobbs, New Mexico
 K27GM-D in Preston, Idaho, on virtual channel 10, which rebroadcasts KISU-TV
 K27HJ-D in Pierre, South Dakota
 K27HM-D in Quanah, Texas
 K27HP-D in Alamogordo, New Mexico
 K27HR-D in Manti & Ephraim, Utah, on virtual channel 9, which rebroadcasts KUEN
 K27IG-D in Cortez, etc., Colorado
 K27IH-D in Holyoke, Colorado, on virtual channel 51, which rebroadcasts K16NJ-D
 K27IM-D in Billings, Montana
 K27IS-D in Emery, Utah
 K27JK-D in Glendale, Nevada
 K27JO-D in Strong City, Oklahoma
 K27JP-D in Little Rock, Arkansas
 K27JQ-D in Wolf Point, Montana
 K27JT-D in Fillmore, etc., Utah
 K27JV-D in Kanab, Utah, on virtual channel 5, which rebroadcasts KSL-TV
 K27JW-D in Joplin, Montana
 K27JY-D in London Springs, Oregon
 K27JZ-D in Round Mountain, Nevada
 K27KA-D in Parlin, Colorado, on virtual channel 7, which rebroadcasts K11AT-D
 K27KC-D in Ferron, Utah
 K27KE-D in Huntington, Utah
 K27KH-D in Orderville, Utah
 K27KN-D in Alexandria, Minnesota, on virtual channel 10, which rebroadcasts KWCM-TV
 K27KP-D in Driggs, Idaho
 K27KR-D in Fishlake Resort, Utah
 K27KS-D in Globe/Miami, Arizona
 K27KV-D in Evanston, Wyoming
 K27KW-D in Gold Hill, etc., Oregon
 K27KX-D in Las Animas, Colorado
 K27LD-D in Salix, Iowa
 K27LK-D in Gateview, Colorado, on virtual channel 7, which rebroadcasts K25PT-D
 K27LL-D in Big Falls, Minnesota
 K27LO-D in Emigrant, Montana
 K27LT-D in Baker, Montana
 K27MF-D in Orovada, Nevada
 K27MM-D in Tendoy/Leadore, Idaho
 K27MQ-D in St. George, Utah, on virtual channel 8, which rebroadcasts KCSG
 K27MT-D in Romeo, Colorado
 K27MV-D in Durant, Oklahoma
 K27MW-D in Soda Springs, Idaho
 K27MX-D in Baker Valley, Oregon
 K27MY-D in Altus, Oklahoma
 K27NB-D in Baton Rouge, Louisiana
 K27NC-D in Coeur D'Alene, Idaho
 K27ND-D in Aztec, New Mexico
 K27NF-D in Jackson, Minnesota
 K27NG-D in Fountain Green, Utah
 K27NH-D in Morgan, etc., Utah, on virtual channel 7, which rebroadcasts KUED
 K27NI-D in Neligh, Nebraska
 K27NK-D in Parowan, Enoch, etc., Utah
 K27NL-D in Clovis, New Mexico
 K27NM-D in Delta, etc., Utah
 K27NN-D in Eureka, Nevada
 K27NO-D in Vernal, Utah, on virtual channel 14, which rebroadcasts KJZZ-TV
 K27NP-D in Duchesne, Utah, on virtual channel 30, which rebroadcasts KUCW
 K27NQ-D in Helper, Utah
 K27NR-D in Topock, Arizona
 K27NT-D in Golden Valley, Arizona
 K27NU-D in Green River, Utah
 K27NV-D in Scofield, Utah
 K27NW-D in East Price, Utah, on virtual channel 30, which rebroadcasts KUCW
 K27NX-D in Ridgecrest, California, on virtual channel 5, which rebroadcasts KTLA
 K27NY-D in Clear Creek, Utah
 K27NZ-D in Longview, Washington, on virtual channel 12, which rebroadcasts KPTV and on virtual channel 49, which rebroadcasts KPDX
 K27OD-D in Verdi/Mogul, Nevada
 K27OF-D in Crested Butte, Colorado
 K27OG-D in Clarendon, Texas
 K27OH-D in Lund & Preston, Nevada
 K27OI-D in Mina/Luning, Nevada
 K27OJ-D in El Paso, Texas
 K27OM-D in Valmy, Nevada
 K27ON-D in Lucerne Valley, California, on virtual channel 27
 K27OO-D in Ellensburg, Washington
 K27OP-D in Oro Valley/Tucson, Arizona
 K27OR-D in Klagetoh, Arizona
 K27OU-D in Lovell, Wyoming
 K27OV-D in Woody Creek, Colorado
 K27OW-D in Rochester, Minnesota
 K27OY-D in Memphis, Tennessee
 K27PC-D in Yuma, Arizona
 K27PE-D in Gustine, California
 K30GC-D in Rural Beaver, etc., Utah
 K40MV-D in Susanville, etc., California
 KAAH-TV in Honolulu, Hawaii
 KAIT in Jonesboro, Arkansas
 KAMC in Lubbock, Texas
 KASA-TV in Santa Fe, New Mexico
 KASW in Phoenix, Arizona, an ATSC 3.0 station, on virtual channel 61
 KAVC-LD in Denver, Colorado, on virtual channel 48
 KBAX-LD in Twin Falls, Idaho
 KBGU-LD in St. Louis, Missouri, on virtual channel 33
 KBKI-LD in Boise, Idaho
 KBPX-LD in Houston, Texas, on virtual channel 46
 KBTC-TV in Tacoma, Washington, on virtual channel 28
 KBTV-CD in Sacramento, California, on virtual channel 8
 KBTV-TV in Port Arthur, Texas
 KBVO in Llano, Texas
 KCOR-CD in San Antonio, Texas
 KCPM in Grand Forks, North Dakota
 KCWS-LD in Sioux Falls, South Dakota
 KCWV in Duluth, Minnesota
 KDFI in Dallas, Texas, on virtual channel 27
 KDJB-LD in Hondo, Texas
 KDKJ-LD in Tyler, Texas
 KEBK-LD in Bakersfield, California
 KEDD-LD in Los Angeles, California
 KETF-CD in Laredo, Texas
 KEYT-TV in Santa Barbara, California
 KFDY-LD in Lincoln, Nebraska
 KFOR-TV in Oklahoma City, Oklahoma
 KFTA-TV in Fort Smith, Arkansas
 KFVT-LD in Wichita, Kansas
 KFXA in Cedar Rapids, Iowa
 KGJT-CD in Grand Junction, Colorado
 KHGI-CD in North Platte, Nebraska
 KLUF-LD in Lufkin, Texas
 KLWY in Cheyenne, Wyoming
 KNWS-LD in Brownsville, Texas
 KNXG-LD in College Station, Texas
 KOHA-LD in Omaha, Nebraska
 KORO in Corpus Christi, Texas
 KPCD-LD in San Fernando, California
 KPJK in San Mateo, California, on virtual channel 60
 KPOM-CD in Ontario, California, on virtual channel 14
 KQHO-LD in Houston, Texas, uses KBPX-LD's spectrum, on virtual channel 27
 KRPV-DT in Roswell, New Mexico
 KRWF in Redwood Falls, Minnesota, on virtual channel 43
 KRZG-CD in McAllen, Texas
 KSCD-LD in Hemet, California
 KSFV-CD in Los Angeles, California, uses KPOM-CD's spectrum, on virtual channel 27
 KSKC-CD in Pablo/Ronan, Montana
 KSLM-LD in Dallas, Oregon, on virtual channel 27
 KSNT in Topeka, Kansas
 KTBV-LD in Los Angeles, California, on virtual channel 12
 KTVE in El Dorado, Arkansas
 KTVW-CD in Flagstaff/Doney Park, Arizona, on virtual channel 6
 KUCO-LD in Chico, California
 KUED in Salt Lake City, Utah, on virtual channel 7
 KUNU-LD in Victoria, Texas
 KVER-CD in Indio, California
 KVEW in Kennewick, Washington
 KVSN-DT in Pueblo, Colorado
 KWBH-LD in Rapid City, South Dakota
 KWYF-LD in Casper, Wyoming
 KXNV-LD in Incline Village, Nevada
 KYAM-LD in Hereford, Texas
 KYMB-LD in Monterey, California
 KYPO-LD in Tacna, Arizona
 W18CJ in Quincy, Illinois
 W27AU-D in Wausau, Wisconsin
 W27DG-D in Millersburg, Ohio, on virtual channel 39, which rebroadcasts WIVM-LD
 W27DK-D in Columbus, Georgia
 W27DP-D in New Bern, North Carolina
 W27DQ-D in Elmhurst, Michigan
 W27DU-D in Traverse City, Michigan
 W27DZ-D in Mayaguez, Puerto Rico, on virtual channel 51, which rebroadcasts WOST
 W27EC-D in Belvidere, New Jersey, on virtual channel 58, which rebroadcasts WNJB
 W27EE-D in Martinsburg, West Virginia
 W27EF-D in Charleston, West Virginia
 W27EH-D in Hattiesburg, Mississippi
 W27EI-D in Moorefield, West Virginia
 W27EJ-D in Sterling, Illinois
 W27EK-D in Boone, North Carolina
 W27EL-D in Champaign, Illinois
 W27EO-D in Panama City, Florida
 W27EP-D in Destin, Florida
 W27EQ-D in Peoria, Illinois
 W27ET-D in Maple Valley, Michigan
 W48CL in Grand Rapids, Michigan
 WADL in Mount Clemens, Michigan, on virtual channel 38
 WAGA-TV in Atlanta, Georgia, on virtual channel 5
 WAIQ in Montgomery, Alabama
 WAPA-TV in San Juan, Puerto Rico, on virtual channel 4
 WBSE-LD in Charleston, South Carolina
 WBUN-LD in Birmingham, Alabama
 WCBI-TV in Columbus, Mississippi
 WFMZ-TV (DRT) in Boyertown, Pennsylvania, on virtual channel 69
 WFNA in Gulf Shores, Alabama, an ATSC 3.0 station
 WGEI-LD in Enterprise, Alabama
 WGTB-CD in Charlotte, North Carolina, on virtual channel 28
 WGZT-LD in Key West, Florida
 WHJC-LP in Williamson, West Virginia
 WHVL-LD in State College, etc., Pennsylvania
 WHWC-TV in Menomonie, Wisconsin, on virtual channel 28
 WILC-CD in Sugar Grove, Illinois
 WIVT in Binghamton, New York
 WJGN-CD in Chesapeake, Virginia
 WKRN-TV in Nashville, Tennessee, on virtual channel 2
 WLJT-DT in Lexington, Tennessee
 WLZE-LD in Fort Myers, Florida
 WMAR-TV in Baltimore, Maryland, on virtual channel 2
 WMJQ-CD in Syracuse, New York
 WNAL-LD in Scottsboro, Alabama
 WNDU-TV in South Bend, Indiana
 WNYW in New York, New York, on virtual channel 5
 WOCD-LD in Dunnellon, Florida
 WOCV-CD in Cleveland, Ohio
 WPDE-TV in Florence, South Carolina
 WPNM-LD in Liepsic, Ohio
 WPSJ-CD in Hammonton, New Jersey, on virtual channel 8
 WPXR-TV in Roanoke, Virginia
 WQLN in Erie, Pennsylvania
 WRDQ in Orlando, Florida, on virtual channel 27
 WSFL-TV in Miami, Florida, on virtual channel 39
 WSOT-LD in Marion, Indiana, on virtual channel 27
 WTAE-TV in Pittsburgh, Pennsylvania, on virtual channel 4
 WTBT-LD in Tampa, Florida
 WTTE in Columbus, Ohio, on virtual channel 28
 WTTV in Bloomington, Indiana, on virtual channel 4
 WTVQ-DT in Lexington, Kentucky
 WTXL-TV in Tallahassee, Florida
 WUNI in Marlborough, Massachusetts, on virtual channel 66
 WUNP-TV in Roanoke Rapids, North Carolina, on virtual channel 36
 WUNW in Canton, North Carolina
 WVTV in Milwaukee, Wisconsin, on virtual channel 18
 WWAX-LD in Westmoreland, New Hampshire
 WWJE-DT in Derry, New Hampshire, uses WUNI'S spectrum, on virtual channel 50
 WWL-TV in New Orleans, Louisiana
 WWRJ-LD in Jacksonville, Florida
 WXSG-LD in Springfield, Illinois
 WYJH-LD in White Lake, New York, on virtual channel 51, which rebroadcasts WYNB-LD
 WYME-CD in Gainesville, Florida

The following stations, which are no longer licensed, formerly broadcast on digital channel 27:
 K27BZ-D in Wellington, Texas
 K27EC-D in Lake Havasu City, Arizona
 K27EE-D in Ukiah, California
 K27JJ-D in Forbes/Jasper Cty, Texas
 K27MG-D in Columbia, Missouri
 KHGI-LD in O'Neil, Nebraska
 KNYS-LD in Natchitoches, Louisiana
 KULG-LD in Springfield, Missouri
 W27DH-D in Evansville, Indiana
 W27DV-D in Bluffton–Hilton Head, Georgia
 WBKH-LD in Port Charlotte, Florida
 WPCP-CD in New Castle, Pennsylvania
 WUDI-LD in Myrtle Beach, South Carolina

References

27 digital